Andrei Aleksandrovich Usachyov (born 29 April 1986) is a former Russian professional footballer.

Club career
He made his debut for FC Lokomotiv Moscow on 12 November 2005 in a Russian Cup game against FC Metallurg-Kuzbass Novokuznetsk.

He played two seasons in the Russian Football National League for FC KAMAZ Naberezhnye Chelny and FC MVD Rossii Moscow.

External links
 
 

1986 births
People from Orsk
Living people
Russian footballers
Association football defenders
FC Lokomotiv Moscow players
FK Vėtra players
FC KAMAZ Naberezhnye Chelny players
FC Orenburg players
Wigry Suwałki players
FK Banga Gargždai players
A Lyga players
II liga players
I Lyga players
Uzbekistan Super League players
Russian expatriate footballers
Expatriate footballers in Lithuania
Expatriate footballers in Poland
Expatriate footballers in Uzbekistan
FC MVD Rossii Moscow players
Sportspeople from Orenburg Oblast